Barbacena is a municipality in the state of Minas Gerais, Brazil. As of 2020, the municipality had 138,204 inhabitants.

Barbacena has a humid tropical climate with cool summers due to the elevation. The cool climate and abundant rainfall have made Barbacena a center for flower production — the city is the biggest producer of flowers in Minas Gerais, and is nicknamed "City of Roses". Cattle raising and the dairy industry are quite developed and the city is a big producer of milk products; there are also several small textile factories.

Barbacena is also the home of the Preparatory School of Air Cadets (the sixteenth best high school of the country, which belongs to the Brazilian Air Force) and of a Medical School, Faculdade de Medicina de Barbacena (Faculty of Medicine of Barbacena). The city is also famous for the Hospital Colônia de Barbacena, a mental hospital founded in 1903, which was known for its abusive treatment of patients. According to sources, 70% of the patients did not have mental illness, and allegedly 60,000 people died in the hospital. It ceased operations in the mid-1980s. It has been compared to a Nazi concentration camp.

Barbacena was the birthplace of the human rights activist and lawyer Heráclito Fontoura Sobral Pinto.

Barbacena was a station on the Estrada de Ferro Oeste de Minas, a narrow gauge railway.

Geography 
According to the modern (2017) geographic classification by Brazil's National Institute of Geography and Statistics (IBGE), the municipality belongs to the Immediate Geographic Region of Barbacena, in the Intermediate Geographic Region of Barbacena.

History
Barbacena was founded on 14 August 1791.

In the 19th century, Barbacena was a principal distribution center for the mining districts of Minas Gerais, but this distinction was lost when the railways were extended beyond that point.

Sister cities 
Barbacena has one sister city, as designated by Sister Cities International:

  Burlington, Iowa, USA

In popular culture

Literature 

 Quincas Borba, by Machado de Assis.

References 

 
1791 establishments in Brazil
Populated places established in 1791
Municipalities in Minas Gerais